The following is a Mackerras pendulum prior to the 2015 Queensland state election.

"Very safe" seats require a swing of more than 20 points to change, "safe" seats 10–20 points to change, "fairly safe" seats 6–10 points, and "marginal" seats less than 6 points.

The following Mackerras pendulum worked by lining up all of the seats according to the percentage point margin post-election on a two-candidate-preferred basis. Following the 2012 election, Ray Hopper left the LNP to lead Katter's Australian Party while two further LNP MPs became independents (Carl Judge in the electorate of Yeerongpilly and Dr Alex Douglas in the electorate of Gaven), resulting in a total of 75 LNP seats, seven Labor seats, three Katter seats and four independent seats. By-elections in Redcliffe and Stafford saw Labor defeat the LNP, reducing the LNP to 73 seats with Labor on 9 seats.

References

Pendulums for Queensland state elections